Medusa Against the Son of Hercules (it: Perseo l'invincibile) is a 1963 Spanish-Italian sword and sandal film directed by Alberto de Martino and starring Richard Harrison. It is loosely based on the myth of Perseus and Medusa.

Plot 
Medusa is a monster that haunts a lake and attacks a group of soldiers; her single eye is capable of turning her victims to stone and the kingdom of Argos uses her to impose suffocating tolls on those who pass through. Perseus, the missing son of the true king of Argos (murdered by a usurper who married his widow), is captured by the troops of an evil monarch and forced to fight as a gladiator. But he escapes and plots to overthrow the villain, still having time to face the Medusa and try his luck if he can bring the petrified soldiers back to life.

Production
The effects of Medusa, portrayed as a wandering tree creature with a single glowing eye, were created by Carlo Rambaldi who later worked on Alien and E.T. The Extra-Terrestrial.

Cast 

 Richard Harrison
 Anna Ranalli
 Arturo Dominici
 Elisa Cegani
 Leo Anchóriz
 Antonio Molino Rojo
 Roberto Camardiel
 Ángel Jordán
 Fernando Liger
 Bruno Scipioni
 Frank Braña
 Miguel de la Riva
 José Luis Ferreiro
 Miguel González
 Rufino Inglés
 Enrique Navarro
 Ángela Pla
 Lorenzo Robledo

Sources

References

Peplum films